Malek Alus (also Romanized as Malek Alūs; also known as  and Alūs) is a village in Pishkuh-e Zalaqi Rural District, Besharat District, Aligudarz County, Lorestan Province, Iran. At the 2006 census, its population was 24, in 4 families.

References 

Towns and villages in Aligudarz County